Donna Lou Speer Nalewaja (October 8, 1939 – September 30, 2021) was an American politician and real estate broker.

Biography
She ran under Leon L. Mallberg for Lieutenant Governor of North Dakota in 1988 as a Republican, and for the North Dakota United States Senate in 1998 against incumbent Byron Dorgan. Nalewaja also served in the North Dakota House of Representatives for Fargo's district 45 from 1982 to 1986, and in the North Dakota Senate from 1986 till 1998.

Nalewaja was married to John, and had four children. She died from COVID-19 in Fargo on September 30, 2021, during the COVID-19 pandemic in North Dakota.

See also
North Dakota gubernatorial election, 1988
North Dakota U.S. Senate election, 1998

Notes

External links
Biography at CNN Politics

1939 births
2021 deaths
American people of Polish descent
20th-century American politicians
20th-century American women politicians
21st-century American politicians
21st-century American women politicians
Candidates in the 1988 United States elections
Candidates in the 1998 United States elections
Republican Party members of the North Dakota House of Representatives
Republican Party North Dakota state senators
People from Winterset, Iowa
Women state legislators in North Dakota
Deaths from the COVID-19 pandemic in North Dakota